In the English speaking world, Carolean era refers to the reign of Charles II (1660–1685) and usually refers to the arts. It is better known as The Restoration.  It followed the Interregnum when there was no king.  The period was noted for the flourishing of the arts following the demise of The Protectorate. It ended with the Glorious Revolution of 1688 when James II of England & VII of Scotland went into exile.

The Carolean era should not be confused with the Caroline era which refers to the reign of Charles II's father, Charles I (1625–1649). The phrase has come into use again recently relating to the accession of King Charles III.

See also
 Restoration (England)

References

Further reading
 Hayden, Judy A. "From Caroline Tears to Carolean Laughter: Re-historicizing the Restoration of Charles II." English 49.194 (2000): 109–126.
 Miyoshi, Riki. "Thomas Killigrew's Early Managerial Career: Carolean Stage Rivalry in London, 1663–1668." Restoration and 18th Century Theatre Research 27.2 (2012): 13–89.
 Rothstein, Eric, and Frances M. Kavenik. The Designs of Carolean Comedy. (Southern Illinois Univ Press, 1988).

Charles II of England
The Restoration
Art concepts